The 1977 Wichita State Shockers football team was an American football team that represented  Wichita State as a member of the Missouri Valley Conference during the 1977 NCAA Division I football season. In their fourth year under head coach Jim Wright, the team compiled a 5–6 record.

Schedule

References

Wichita State
Wichita State Shockers football seasons
Wichita State Shockers football